Union Village is a village that spans Norwich, Vermont and Thetford, Vermont and sits along the Ompompanoosuc River.  It contains a small cluster of homes with many dating to the early 1800s, a red brick Methodist Episcopal church built in 1836, a covered bridge, a small defunct school house, and a United States Army Corps of Engineers flood control dam.

References

French, Susanna H., "Images of American - Thetford" 2014 Arcadia Publishing

Unincorporated communities in Vermont